Ginger Rogers (born Virginia Katherine McMath; July 16, 1911 – April 25, 1995) was an American actress, dancer and singer during the Golden Age of Hollywood. She won an Academy Award for Best Actress for her starring role in Kitty Foyle (1940), and performed during the 1930s in RKO's musical films with Fred Astaire. Her career continued on stage, radio and television throughout much of the 20th century.

Rogers was born in Independence, Missouri, and raised in Kansas City. She and her family moved to Fort Worth, Texas, when she was nine years old. In 1925, she won a Charleston dance contest that helped her launch a successful vaudeville career. After that, she gained recognition as a Broadway actress for her stage debut in Girl Crazy. This led to a contract with Paramount Pictures, which ended after five films. Rogers had her first successful film roles as a supporting actress in 42nd Street (1933) and Gold Diggers of 1933 (1933).

In the 1930s, Rogers's nine films with Fred Astaire are credited with revolutionizing the genre and gave RKO Pictures some of its biggest successes: The Gay Divorcee (1934), Top Hat (1935) and Swing Time (1936). But after two commercial failures with Astaire, she turned her focus to dramatic and comedy films. Her acting was well received by critics and audiences in films such as Stage Door (1937), Vivacious Lady (1938), Bachelor Mother (1939), Primrose Path (1940), The Major and the Minor (1942) and I'll Be Seeing You (1944). After winning the Oscar, Rogers became one of the biggest box-office draws and highest-paid actresses of the 1940s.

Rogers's popularity was peaking by the end of the decade. She reunited with Astaire in 1949 in the commercially successful The Barkleys of Broadway. She starred in the successful comedy Monkey Business (1952) and was critically lauded for her performance in Tight Spot (1955) before entering an unsuccessful period of filmmaking in the mid-1950s, and returned to Broadway in 1965, playing the lead role in Hello, Dolly! More Broadway roles followed, along with her stage directorial debut in 1985 of an off-Broadway production of Babes in Arms. She continued to act, making television appearances until 1987, and wrote an autobiography Ginger: My Story which was published in 1991. In 1992, Rogers was recognized at the Kennedy Center Honors. She died of natural causes in 1995, at age 83.

During her long career, Rogers made 73 films, and she ranks number 14 on the AFI's 100 Years...100 Stars list of female stars of classic American cinema.

Early life 

Virginia Katherine McMath was born on July 16, 1911, in Independence, Missouri, the only child of Lela Emogene Owens, a newspaper reporter, scriptwriter, and movie producer, and William Eddins McMath, an electrical engineer. Her maternal grandparents were Wilma Saphrona (née Ball) and Walter Winfield Owens. She was of Scottish, Welsh, and English ancestry. Her mother gave birth to Ginger at home, having lost a previous child in a hospital. Her parents separated shortly after she was born.After unsuccessfully trying to reunite with his family, McMath kidnapped his daughter twice, and her mother divorced him soon thereafter. Rogers said that she never saw her natural father again.

In 1915, Rogers was left with her grandparents, who lived in nearby Kansas City, while her mother made a trip to Hollywood in an effort to get an essay she had written made into a film. Lela succeeded and continued to write scripts for Fox Studios.

One of Rogers's young cousins had a hard time pronouncing "Virginia", giving her the nickname "Ginger".

When Rogers was nine years old, her mother married John Logan Rogers. Ginger took the surname Rogers, although she was never legally adopted. They lived in Fort Worth. Her mother became a theater critic for a local newspaper, the Fort Worth Record. She attended, but did not graduate from, Fort Worth's Central High School (later renamed R. L. Paschal High School.) 

As a teenager, Rogers thought of becoming a school teacher, but with her mother's interest in Hollywood and the theater, her early exposure to the theater increased. Waiting for her mother in the wings of the Majestic Theatre, she began to sing and dance along with the performers on stage.

Career

1925–1929: Vaudeville and Broadway 
Rogers's entertainment career began when the traveling vaudeville act of Eddie Foy came to Fort Worth and needed a quick stand-in. In 1925 the 14-year-old entered and won a Charleston dance contest, the prize allowed her to tour as Ginger Rogers and the Redheads for six months on the Orpheum Circuit. In 1926 the act performed at an 18-month-old theater called The Craterian in Medford, Oregon. This theater honored her years later by changing its name to the Craterian Ginger Rogers Theater. When the M.G.M film The Barrier premiered in San Bernardino, California, in February 1926, Rogers's vaudeville act was featured. The local newspaper commented, “Clever little Ginger Rogers showed why she won the Texas state championship as a Charleston dancer.”

At 17, Rogers married Jack Culpepper, a singer/dancer/comedian/recording artist of the day who worked under the name Jack Pepper (according to Ginger's autobiography and Life magazine, she knew Culpepper when she was a child, as her cousin's boyfriend). They formed a short-lived vaudeville double act known as "Ginger and Pepper". The marriage was over within a year, and she went back to touring with her mother. When the tour got to New York City, she stayed, getting radio singing jobs and then her Broadway debut in the musical Top Speed, which opened on Christmas Day, 1929.

Within two weeks of opening in Top Speed, Rogers was chosen to star on Broadway in Girl Crazy by George Gershwin and Ira Gershwin. Fred Astaire was hired to help the dancers with their choreography. Her appearance in Girl Crazy made her an overnight star at the age of 19.

1929–1933: Early film roles 

Rogers's first movie roles were in a trio of short films made in 1929: Night in the Dormitory, A Day of a Man of Affairs, and Campus Sweethearts. In 1930, Paramount Pictures signed her to a seven-year contract.

Rogers soon got herself out of the Paramount contract—under which she had made five feature films at Astoria Studios in Astoria, Queens—and moved with her mother to Hollywood. When she got to California, she signed a three-picture deal with Pathé Exchange. Two of her pictures at Pathé were Suicide Fleet (1931) and Carnival Boat (1932) in which she played opposite future Hopalong Cassidy star, William Boyd. Rogers also made feature films for Warner Bros., Monogram, and Fox in 1932, and was named one of 15 WAMPAS Baby Stars. She then made a significant breakthrough as Anytime Annie in the Warner Bros. film 42nd Street (1933). She went on to make a series of films at Warner Bros. most notably in Gold Diggers of 1933  where her solo, "We're In The Money", included a verse in Pig Latin. She then moved to RKO Studios, was put under contract and started work on Flying Down to Rio, a picture starring Dolores del Río and Gene Raymond but it was soon stolen by Rogers and Broadway star Fred Astaire.

1933–1939: Partnership of Rogers and Astaire 
Rogers was known for her partnership with Fred Astaire. Together, from 1933 to 1939, they made nine musical films at RKO: Flying Down to Rio (1933), The Gay Divorcee (1934), Roberta (1935), Top Hat (1935), Follow the Fleet (1936), Swing Time (1936), Shall We Dance (1937), Carefree (1938), and The Story of Vernon and Irene Castle (1939). The Barkleys of Broadway (1949) was produced later at MGM. They revolutionized the Hollywood musical by introducing dance routines of unprecedented elegance and virtuosity with sweeping long shots set to songs specially composed for them by the greatest popular song composers of the day. One such composer was Cole Porter with "Night and Day", a song Astaire sang to Rogers with the line "... you are the one" in two of their movies, being particularly poignant in their last pairing of The Barkleys of Broadway.

Arlene Croce, Hermes Pan, Hannah Hyam, and John Mueller all consider Rogers to have been Astaire's finest dance partner, principally because of her ability to combine dancing skills, natural beauty, and exceptional abilities as a dramatic actress and comedian, thus truly complementing Astaire, a peerless dancer. The resulting song and dance partnership enjoyed a unique credibility in the eyes of audiences.

Of the 33 partnered dances Rogers performed with Astaire, Croce and Mueller have highlighted the infectious spontaneity of her performances in the comic numbers "I'll Be Hard to Handle" from Roberta, "I'm Putting All My Eggs in One Basket" from Follow the Fleet, and "Pick Yourself Up" from Swing Time. They also point to the use Astaire made of her remarkably flexible back in classic romantic dances such as "Smoke Gets in Your Eyes" from Roberta, "Cheek to Cheek" from Top Hat, and "Let's Face the Music and Dance" from Follow the Fleet.

Although the dance routines were choreographed by Astaire and his collaborator Hermes Pan, both have testified to her consummate professionalism, even during periods of intense strain, as she tried to juggle her many other contractual film commitments with the punishing rehearsal schedules of Astaire, who made at most two films in any one year. In 1986, shortly before his death, Astaire remarked, "All the girls I ever danced with thought they couldn't do it, but of course they could. So they always cried. All except Ginger. No, no, Ginger never cried".

John Mueller summed up Rogers's abilities as: "Rogers was outstanding among Astaire's partners, not because she was superior to others as a dancer, but, because, as a skilled, intuitive actress, she was cagey enough to realize that acting did not stop when dancing began ... the reason so many women have fantasized about dancing with Fred Astaire is that Ginger Rogers conveyed the impression that dancing with him is the most thrilling experience imaginable".

Author Dick Richards, on p. 162 of his book Ginger: Salute to a Star, quoted Astaire saying to Raymond Rohauer, curator at the New York Gallery of Modern Art, "Ginger was brilliantly effective. She made everything work for her. Actually she made things very fine for both of us and she deserves most of the credit for our success."

In a 1976 episode of the popular British talk-show Parkinson (Season 5, Episode 24), host Sir Michael Parkinson asked Astaire who his favorite dancing partner was. Astaire answered, "Excuse me, I must say Ginger was certainly [uh, uh,] the one. You know, the most effective partner I ever had. Everyone knows."

In her classic 1930s musicals with Astaire, Ginger Rogers, co-billed with him, was paid less than Fred, the creative force behind the dances, who also received 10% of the profits. She was also paid less than many of the supporting "farceurs" billed beneath her, in spite of her much more central role in the films' great financial successes. This was personally grating to her and had effects upon her relationships at RKO, especially with director Mark Sandrich, whose purported disrespect of Rogers prompted a sharp letter of reprimand from producer Pandro Berman, which she deemed important enough to publish in her autobiography. Rogers fought hard for her contract and salary rights and for better films and scripts.

After 15 months apart and with RKO facing bankruptcy, the studio paired Fred and Ginger for another movie titled Carefree, but it lost money. Next came The Story of Vernon and Irene Castle, based on a true story, but the serious plot and tragic ending resulted in the worst box-office receipts of any of their films. This was driven not by diminished popularity, but by the hard 1930s economic reality. The production costs of musicals, always significantly more costly than regular features, continued to increase at a much faster rate than admissions.

1933–1939: Success in nonmusicals 

Both before and immediately after her dancing and acting partnership with Fred Astaire ended, Rogers starred in a number of successful nonmusical films. Stage Door (1937) demonstrated her dramatic capacity, as the loquacious yet vulnerable girl next door and tough-minded theatrical hopeful, opposite Katharine Hepburn. Successful comedies included Vivacious Lady (1938) with James Stewart, Fifth Avenue Girl (1939), where she played an out-of-work girl sucked into the lives of a wealthy family, and Bachelor Mother (1939), with David Niven, in which she played a shop girl who is falsely thought to have abandoned her baby.

In 1934, Rogers sued Sylvia of Hollywood for $100K for defamation. The fitness guru and radio personality had claimed that Rogers was on her radio show when, in fact, she was not.

On March 5, 1939, Rogers starred in "Single Party Going East", an episode of Silver Theater on CBS radio.

1940–1949: Career peak and reuniting with Astaire 
In 1941 Rogers won the Academy Award for Best Actress for her role in 1940's Kitty Foyle. She enjoyed considerable success during the early 1940s, and was RKO's hottest property during this period. In Roxie Hart (1942), based on the same play which later served as the template for the musical Chicago, Rogers played a wisecracking flapper in a love triangle on trial for the murder of her lover; set in the era of prohibition. Most of the film takes place in a women's jail.

In the neorealist Primrose Path (1940), directed by Gregory La Cava, she played a prostitute's daughter trying to avoid family pressure into following the fate of her mother. Further highlights of this period included Tom, Dick, and Harry, a 1941 comedy in which she dreams of marrying three different men; I'll Be Seeing You (1944), with Joseph Cotten; and Billy Wilder's first Hollywood feature film: The Major and the Minor (1942), in which she played a woman who masquerades as a 12-year-old to get a cheap train ticket and finds herself obliged to continue the ruse for an extended period. This film featured a performance by Rogers's real mother, Lela, playing her film mother.

After becoming a free agent, Rogers made hugely successful films with other studios in the mid-'40s, including Tender Comrade (1943), Lady in the Dark (1944), and Week-End at the Waldorf (1945), and became the highest-paid performer in Hollywood. However, by the end of the decade, her film career had peaked. Arthur Freed reunited her with Fred Astaire in The Barkleys of Broadway in 1949, when Judy Garland was unable to appear in the role that was to have reunited her with her Easter Parade co-star.

1950–1987: Later career 
Rogers's film career entered a period of gradual decline in the 1950s, as parts for older actresses became more difficult to obtain, but she still scored with some solid movies. She starred in Storm Warning (1950) with Ronald Reagan and Doris Day, a noir, anti-Ku Klux Klan film by Warner Bros. In 1952 Rogers starred in two comedies featuring Marilyn Monroe, Monkey Business with Cary Grant, directed by Howard Hawks, and We're Not Married!. She followed those with a role in Dreamboat alongside Clifton Webb, as his wife. She played the female lead in Tight Spot (1955), a mystery thriller, with Edward G. Robinson. After a series of unremarkable films, she scored a great popular success on Broadway in 1965, playing Dolly Levi in the long-running Hello, Dolly!

In later life, Rogers remained on good terms with Astaire; she presented him with a special Academy Award in 1950, and they were copresenters of individual Academy Awards in 1967, during which they elicited a standing ovation when they came on stage in an impromptu dance. In 1969, she had the lead role in another long-running popular production, Mame, from the book by Jerome Lawrence and Robert Edwin Lee, with music and lyrics by Jerry Herman, at the Theatre Royal Drury Lane in the West End of London, arriving for the role on the liner Queen Elizabeth 2 from New York City. Her docking there occasioned the maximum of pomp and ceremony at Southampton. She became the highest-paid performer in the history of the West End up to that time. The production ran for 14 months and featured a royal command performance for Queen Elizabeth II.

From the 1950s onward, Rogers made occasional appearances on television, even substituting for a vacationing Hal March on The $64,000 Question. In the later years of her career, she made guest appearances in three different series by Aaron Spelling: The Love Boat (1979), Glitter (1984), and Hotel (1987), which was her final screen appearance as an actress. In 1985, Rogers fulfilled a long-standing wish to direct when she directed the musical Babes in Arms off-Broadway in Tarrytown, New York, at 74 years old. It was produced by Michael Lipton and Robert Kennedy of Kennedy Lipton Productions. The production starred Broadway talents Donna Theodore, Carleton Carpenter, James Brennan, Randy Skinner, Karen Ziemba, Dwight Edwards, and Kim Morgan. It is also noted in her autobiography Ginger, My Story.

Honors 
The Kennedy Center honored Ginger Rogers in December 1992. This event, which was shown on television, was somewhat marred when Astaire's widow, Robyn Smith, who permitted clips of Astaire dancing with Rogers to be shown for free at the function itself, was unable to come to terms with CBS Television for broadcast rights to the clips (all previous rights-holders having donated broadcast rights gratis).

For her contributions to the motion picture industry, Rogers has a star on the Hollywood Walk of Fame at 6772 Hollywood Boulevard.

Personal life 

Rogers, an only child, maintained a close relationship with her mother, Lela Rogers, throughout her life. Lela, a newspaper reporter, scriptwriter, and movie producer, was one of the first women to enlist in the Marine Corps, was a founder of the successful "Hollywood Playhouse" for aspiring actors and actresses on the RKO set, and a founder of the Motion Picture Alliance for the Preservation of American Ideals. Rogers was a lifelong member of the Republican Party, who campaigned for Thomas Dewey in the 1944 presidential election, Barry Goldwater in the 1964 presidential election and Ronald Reagan in the 1966 California gubernatorial election. She was a strong opponent of Franklin Delano Roosevelt, speaking out against both him and his New Deal proposals. She was a member of the Daughters of the American Revolution. 

Rogers and her mother had a very close professional relationship. Lela Rogers was credited with pivotal contributions to her daughter's early successes in New York City and in Hollywood, and gave her much assistance in contract negotiations with RKO. She also wrote a children's mystery book with her daughter as the central character.

Marriages 
Rogers married and divorced five times. She did not have children. 

On March 29, 1929, Rogers married for the first time at age 17 to her dancing partner Jack Pepper (real name Edward Jackson Culpepper). They divorced in 1931, having separated soon after the wedding.  

Rogers dated Mervyn LeRoy in 1932, but they ended the relationship and remained friends until his death in 1987. In 1934, she married actor Lew Ayres (1908–96). They divorced seven years later. 

In 1943, Rogers married her third husband, Jack Briggs, who was a U.S. Marine. They divorced in 1949. 

In 1953, she married Jacques Bergerac, a French actor 16 years her junior, whom she met on a trip to Paris. A lawyer in France, he came to Hollywood with her and became an actor. They divorced in 1957. 

Her fifth and final husband was director and producer William Marshall. They married in 1961 and divorced in 1969, after his bouts with alcohol and the financial collapse of their joint film production company in Jamaica.

Friendships 
Rogers was lifelong friends with actresses Lucille Ball and Bette Davis. She appeared with Ball in an episode of Here's Lucy on November 22, 1971, in which Rogers danced the Charleston for the first time in many years. Rogers starred in one of the earliest films co-directed and co-scripted by a woman, Wanda Tuchock's Finishing School (1934). Rogers maintained a close friendship with her cousin, writer/socialite Phyllis Fraser, wife of Random House publisher Bennett Cerf, but was not Rita Hayworth's natural cousin, as has been reported. Hayworth's maternal uncle, Vinton Hayworth, was married to Rogers's maternal aunt, Jean Owens.

Religion 
Rogers was raised a Christian Scientist and remained a lifelong adherent, a topic she discussed at length in her autobiography. Rogers's mother died in 1977. She remained at the 4-Rs (Rogers' Rogue River Ranch) until 1990. When the property was sold, Rogers moved to nearby Medford, Oregon.

Interests 
Rogers was a talented tennis player, and entered the 1950 US Open. However, she and Frank Shields were knocked out of the mixed doubles competition in the first round.

Legacy 
The city of Independence, Missouri designated the birthplace of Ginger Rogers a Historic Landmark Property in 1994. On July 16, 1994, Ginger and her secretary, Roberta Olden, visited Independence, Missouri, to appear at the Ginger Rogers' Day celebration presented by the city. Rogers was present when Mayor Ron Stewart affixed a Historic Landmark Property plaque to the front of the house where she was born on July 16, 1911. She signed over 2,000 autographs at this event, which was one of her last public appearances.

The home was purchased in 2016 by Three Trails Cottages and restored, then transformed into a museum dedicated to Lela Owens-Rogers and Ginger Rogers. It contains memorabilia, magazines, movie posters, and many items from the ranch that Lela and Ginger owned. Several gowns that Ginger Rogers wore are on display. The museum was open seasonally from April to September, and several special events were held at the site each year. It closed in August 2019.

Rogers made her last public appearance on March 18, 1995, when she received the Women's International Center (WIC) Living Legacy Award. For many years, Rogers regularly supported, and held in-person presentations, at the Craterian Theater, in Medford, where she had performed in 1926 as a vaudevillian. The theater was comprehensively restored in 1997 and posthumously renamed in her honor as the Craterian Ginger Rogers Theater.

Death 

Rogers spent winters in Rancho Mirage and summers in Medford, Oregon. She died at her Rancho Mirage home on April 25, 1995, after previously having lapsed into a diabetic coma, and then suffering a fatal stroke. She was 83. She was cremated and her ashes interred with her mother Lela Emogene in Oakwood Memorial Park Cemetery in Chatsworth, California.

Legacy 
 Likenesses of Astaire and Rogers, apparently painted over from the "Cheek to Cheek" dance in Top Hat, are in the "Lucy in the Sky With Diamonds" section of The Beatles film Yellow Submarine (1968).
 Rogers's image is one of many famous women's images of the 1930s and 1940s featured on the bedroom wall in the Anne Frank House in Amsterdam, a gallery of magazine cuttings pasted on the wall created by Anne and her sister Margot while hiding from the Nazis. When the house became a museum, the gallery the Frank sisters created was preserved under glass.
 Ginger The Musical  by Robert Kennedy and Paul Becker which Ginger Rogers approved and was to direct on Broadway the year of her death was in negotiations as late as the 2016–17 Broadway season. Marshall Mason directed its first production in 2001 starring Donna McKechnie and Nili Bassman and was choreographed by Randy Skinner.
 Rogers was the heroine of a novel, Ginger Rogers and the Riddle of the Scarlet Cloak (1942, by Lela E. Rogers), in which "the heroine has the same name and appearance as the famous actress, but has no connection ... it is as though the famous actress has stepped into an alternate reality in which she is an ordinary person." It is part of a series known as "Whitman Authorized Editions", 16 books published between 1941 and 1947 that featured a film actress as heroine.
 The Dancing House in Prague (Czech: Tančící dům), sometimes known as Ginger and Fred, was designed by American architect Frank Gehry and inspired by the dancing of Astaire and Rogers.
 In the 1981 film Pennies From Heaven, Bernadette Peters's character dances with Steve Martin's as they watch Fred and Ginger's "Let's Face the Music and Dance" sequence from 1936's Follow the Fleet, using it as their inspiration.
 Federico Fellini's film Ginger and Fred centers on two aging Italian impersonators of Ginger Rogers and Fred Astaire. Rogers sued the production and the distributor when the film was released in the U.S. for misappropriation and infringement of her public personality. Her claims were dismissed, as according to the judgment, the film only obliquely related to Astaire and her.
 Rogers was among the sixteen Golden Age Hollywood stars referenced in the bridge of Madonna's 1990 single "Vogue".
 Rogers is the namesake of the Ginger Rogers, a cocktail containing gin, ginger, and mint.
 Rogers was the subject of a quotation summarizing women's capacity to achieve that is popular among feminists: "Rogers did everything [Astaire] did, backwards . . . and in high heels." The quote comes from a 1982 Frank and Ernest comic strip by Bob Thaves.
 A musical about the life of Rogers, entitled Backwards in High Heels, premiered in Florida in early 2007.

Filmography

See also 
 List of actors with Academy Award nominations
 List of dancers

References

Bibliography

External links 

 
 
 
 Ginger Rogers – Appreciations
 Ginger Rogers biography from Reel Classics
 John Mueller's 1991 New York Times review of Ginger: My Story
 Photographs and literature
 Owens-Rogers Museum in Independence, Missouri

1911 births
1995 deaths
20th-century American actresses
20th-century American singers
20th-century American women singers
20th Century Studios contract players
Actresses from California
Actresses from Fort Worth, Texas
Actresses from Kansas City, Missouri
American anti-communists
American ballroom dancers
American Christian Scientists
American female dancers
American film actresses
American musical theatre actresses
American people of English descent
American people of Scottish descent
American people of Welsh descent
American stage actresses
American tap dancers
American television actresses
Best Actress Academy Award winners
Burials at Oakwood Memorial Park Cemetery
California Republicans
Conservatism in the United States
Daughters of the American Revolution people
Kennedy Center honorees
Musicians from Kansas City, Missouri
Old Right (United States)
Paramount Pictures contract players
People from Independence, Missouri
People from Rancho Mirage, California
RKO Pictures contract players
Singers from California
Singers from Missouri
Singers from Texas
Traditional pop music singers
Vaudeville performers
WAMPAS Baby Stars
Warner Bros. contract players